A medical procedure is defined as non-invasive when no break in the skin is created and there is no contact with the mucosa, or skin break, or internal body cavity beyond a natural or artificial body orifice. For example, deep palpation and percussion are non-invasive but a rectal examination is invasive. Likewise, examination of the ear-drum or inside the nose or a wound dressing change all fall outside the definition of non-invasive procedure. There are many non-invasive procedures, ranging from simple observation, to specialised forms of surgery, such as radiosurgery. Extracorporeal shock wave lithotripsy is a non-invasive treatment of stones in the kidney, gallbladder or liver, using an acoustic pulse. For centuries, physicians have employed many simple non-invasive methods based on physical parameters in order to assess body function in health and disease (physical examination and inspection), such as pulse-taking, the auscultation of heart sounds and lung sounds (using the stethoscope), temperature examination (using thermometers), respiratory examination, peripheral vascular examination, oral examination, abdominal examination, external percussion and palpation, blood pressure measurement (using the sphygmomanometer), change in body volumes (using plethysmograph), audiometry, eye examination, and many others.

Diagnostic images
 Bioluminescence imaging
 Dermatoscopy
 Diffuse optical tomography
 Gamma camera
 Computed tomography
 Infrared imaging of the body
 Magnetic resonance elastography
 Magnetic resonance imaging
 Magnetic resonance spectroscopy
 Optical coherence tomography
 Posturography
 Radiography, fluoroscopy
 Ultrasonography and echocardiography

Diagnostic signals
 Electrocardiography
 Electroencephalography
 Electromyography
 Photoplethysmograph
 Electrical impedance tomography
 Electroneuronography
 Electroretinography
 Electronystagmography
 Magnetoencephalography
 Evoked potentials
 Impedance phlebography
 Nuclear magnetic resonance

Therapy
 Epidermal radioisotope therapy
 Radiation therapy
 Brachytherapy
 Lithotripsy
 Defibrillation
 Biofeedback
 Oxygen therapy
 Non-invasive ventilation
 VPAP
 BIPAP
 Neurally adjusted ventilatory assist
 Biphasic cuirass ventilation
 Therapeutic ultrasound

See also
Minimally invasive procedures

References

Medical procedures